The 1933 East Carolina Teachers football team was an American football team that represented East Carolina Teachers College—now known as East Carolina University—as an independent during the 1933 college football season. In their second and final season under head coach Kenneth Beatty, the team compiled a 1–5 record.

Schedule

References

East Carolina
East Carolina Pirates football seasons
East Carolina Teachers football